Peter D. T. A. Elliott (born 1941) is an American mathematician, working in the field of number theory. He is one of the two mathematicians after whom the Elliott–Halberstam conjecture is named.

He obtained his PhD in 1969, from the University of Cambridge,  under the supervision of Harold Davenport. He currently teaches at the University of Colorado at Boulder.

Books

 Probabilistic Number Theory I - Mean Value Theorems, Spring-Verlag New York, 1979
 Probabilistic Number Theory II - Central Limit Theorems, Springer-Verlag New York, 1980 
 Arithmetic Functions and Integer Products, Springer-Verlag New York, 1985
 Duality in Analytic Number Theory, Cambridge University Press, 1997
 Analytic and Elementary Number Theory - A Tribute to Mathematical Legend Paul Erdos, Krishnaswami Alladi, Andrew Granville, and G. Tenenbaum, Springer US, 1998

References

External links
Publications list at CU Experts site

20th-century American mathematicians
21st-century American mathematicians
Number theorists
1941 births
Living people